The 1984–85 Allsvenskan was the 51st season of the top division of Swedish handball. 12 teams competed in the league. Redbergslids IK won the regular season and also won the playoffs to claim their ninth Swedish title. Borlänge HK were relegated.

League table

Playoffs

Semifinals
Redbergslids IK–GUIF 23–24, 31–25, 34–27 (Redbergslids IK advance to the finals)
HK Drott–LUGI 26–19, 10–16, 17–16 (HK Drott advance to the finals)

Finals
Redbergslids IK–HK Drott 19–18, 24–28, 19–21, 19–15, 21–20 (Redbergslids IK champions)

References 

Swedish handball competitions